Joseph Jimenez is the former CEO of the American Swiss pharmaceutical company Novartis.

Education
Jimenez earned a bachelor's degree from Stanford University in 1982, and an MBA from Berkeley's Haas School of Business in 1984.

Career

Early career
Jimenez began his career at Clorox before joining ConAgra Foods. Prior to joining Novartis, he was head of H. J. Heinz Company's North American business from 2002 to 2006. He was also a non-executive director of AstraZeneca from 2002 to 2007, as well as an advisor for the Blackstone Group.

Novartis
Jimenez joined Novartis in 2007 as Division Head of Novartis Pharmaceutical and was named CEO in 2010 by his predecessor and Chairman Daniel Vasella.

During his time at Novartis, Jimenez increasingly applied standard business metrics to pharma cash flow, purchasing and competitive bidding, confident that his experience in consumer goods would help to realize improvements in Novartis' operations. His cost-cutting moves, focused mostly on marketing and administration, came steadily, with more than a billion cut in 2010, and even more than that in 2011.

Jimenez joined the board of directors at General Motors on June 9, 2015

Jimenez resigned from Novartis, leaving in February 2018, and was succeeded by Vasant Narasimhan.

He joined the Board of Directors of San Francisco biotech startup uBiome in September 2018 and stepped down in April 2019 to start the biotech venture fund Aditum Bio.

Jimenez also has served on the Board of Directors of Procter & Gamble since 2018, where he is lead independent director. He also serves as Chairman of Century Therapeutics, an iPSC derived allogeneic cell therapy company, and is on the Board of Graphite Bio, a gene therapy company.

References

External links
Joseph Jimenez on Improving Healthcare in Africa - Huffington Post

Swiss businesspeople
Living people
Year of birth missing (living people)
Novartis people
Stanford University alumni
University of California, Berkeley alumni